"The Sign of Three" is the second episode of the third series of the BBC television series Sherlock. It was written by Stephen Thompson, Mark Gatiss and Steven Moffat, and stars Benedict Cumberbatch as Sherlock Holmes and Martin Freeman as Dr John Watson.  The episode's title is inspired by The Sign of the Four by Sir Arthur Conan Doyle. It is set six months after the series opener "The Empty Hearse" and is primarily centred on the day of Watson's wedding to Mary Morstan. It garnered a viewership of 11.37 million, and received mostly positive reviews.

Plot
In the opening scene, DI Lestrade (Rupert Graves) and Sergeant Donovan (Vinette Robinson) are on the verge of arresting the criminal Waters family that has evaded the police several times. However, when Lestrade receives a text for help from Sherlock, he abandons the case and races to Baker Street, assuming the worst and calling for full backup – only to discover that Sherlock is simply struggling to write a best man speech for John's upcoming wedding to Mary Morstan (Amanda Abbington).

On the morning of the wedding, Mrs. Hudson (Una Stubbs) reminds Sherlock that marriage changes people. At the reception, John is delighted to see Major James Sholto (Alistair Petrie), his former Army CO. Sholto (the name is a reference to a character in The Sign of Four) lives in seclusion, having received death threats and media scrutiny after losing a unit of new soldiers in Afghanistan. Sherlock calls Mycroft (Mark Gatiss), who repeats Mrs. Hudson's suggestion that John and Mary's marriage will change his life.

Sherlock rises to give the best man speech, but he initially hesitates. After reading from the wedding telegrams, Sherlock expresses his deep love and respect for John and launches into a rambling narrative, describing John's role in an attempted murder case, "the Bloody Guardsman"; a Guardsman named Bainbridge (Alfred Enoch) contacted Sherlock, fearing he was being stalked. When Sherlock and Watson got into the Guards' quarters, Bainbridge was presumed dead in a shower room from a stab wound, but no weapon and escape route were found. When questioned by Lestrade, Sherlock reluctantly admits the case wasn't solved but cited it as an example of John's compassion; instead of trying to solve the murder as Sherlock did, John examined Bainbridge's body and discovered he still had a pulse, thus requesting an ambulance and saving his life.

Sherlock's narrative drifts to another case, "the Mayfly Man"; several days after going to a man's apartment for dinner, Tessa (Alice Lowe), a woman who worked as a private nurse, found the apartment was vacated, and the man died weeks ago. Sherlock and John, still inebriated from John's stag night, attempted to search for clues, but were arrested for their drunken antics. The next morning, an amused Lestrade secured their release from jail. Sherlock chatted to other London women with a similar experience but failed to find any significant connection between them. With John's help, he concluded the perpetrator was a man bored with marriage. He disguised himself as recently deceased single men and used their unoccupied homes to meet the women.

While moving to the toast, Sherlock suddenly freezes, recalling Tessa knew John's middle name (Hamish). Aware that John hates and never uses it, he deduces Tessa saw it in a wedding invitation. Sherlock concludes all the women worked for Sholto in various capacities and were bound by confidentiality. The Mayfly Man courted them to find and attack Sholto, and the wedding is his chance. Sherlock slips a note to Sholto, who returns to his hotel room and gets his pistol to defend himself. Sherlock, John, and Mary race to the room to try and save him, but he refuses to open the door until the case is solved. Sherlock deduces the Bloody Guardsman case is linked to Sholto's and pinpoints the military uniform both wore as the common link; since Bainbridge collapsed in the shower, he must have been stabbed with a stiletto-type blade beforehand, but with his military waist belt firmly holding the flesh together, the damage would not take effect until the belt loosened. The victim would not feel it until then. Upon hearing this explanation, Sholto considers suicide by relieving his belt and bleeding to death. Sherlock persuades him not to, primarily by insisting that it would be cruel to do at John's wedding. Sholto then opens the door and requests medical assistance.

That evening, Sherlock apprehends the wedding photographer (Jalaal Hartley) and identifies him to Lestrade as Jonathan Small, the Mayfly Man, deducing he was the only person who could have stabbed Sholto. He points out the photographer's brother was one of the men killed under Sholto's command and concludes that he stabbed Bainbridge as practice for this murder. After Sherlock plays the violin for John and Mary's first dance, he quietly reveals to them that he has observed in Mary "increased appetite, change in taste perception, and sickness in the morning, the signs of three", revealing she is pregnant. Sherlock calms them by explaining that they will make great parents since they've had plenty of practice with him. Despite the happy revelation, the episode ends on a bitter-sweet note. Sherlock sombrely leaves the reception alone upon realizing that his relationship with John will never be the same again.

Production 
The episode was directed by Colm McCarthy, who had previously worked with Moffat on the Doctor Who episode, "The Bells of Saint John". The Radio Times reported that McCarthy was recruited "following the departure of director Paul McGuigan, who is credited with having set the distinctive visual template for the programme". According to some sources, such as the Radio Times, "The Sign of Three" was written by Steve Thompson, who had previously authored the Sherlock episodes "The Blind Banker" and "The Reichenbach Fall". However, in a departure from the show's usual style, all three writers received a "written by" credit in this episode's opening titles. Steven Moffat told a BBC Q&A that he wrote a lot of Sherlock's best man speech.

Filming

The wedding reception scenes were filmed in the orangery at Goldney Hall, Bristol. Other scenes filmed across Bristol include the 'court steps' in the opening scenes are the Victoria Rooms, the bank robbery took place in a former Bank of England building next to Castle Park and John and Mary's wedding scenes were filmed at St Mary's church in Sneyd Park.

Broadcast and reception
The episode was first broadcast on 5 January 2014, on BBC One and BBC One HD at 8:30pm. It attracted 8.8 million viewers, a 31.9% share, which was down from 9.2 million (33.8%) for "The Empty Hearse".

The episode received critical acclaim. The Independents Neela Debnath commented, "While it is not the strongest story of the Sherlock saga, the writing is just as sharp and fresh, with the mind palace element toned down a few notches. The Sign of Three was packed to the rafters with wit and comedy. There was plenty to leave viewers howling with laughter, mainly thanks to Sherlock's general apathy towards humankind."

Caroline Frost of The Huffington Post  commented on the episode's "Conan Doyle-esque recounting of some of their strangest cases", writing, "[t]his combination of montage and memory lane made for an unusual show, somewhere between a Christmas one-off, a Comic Relief-inspired parody and one of these special dream-sequence sitcom episodes." Similarly, Oliver Jia of The Punk Effect stated it as "no doubt the odd duck of the entire Sherlock canon," but proceeded to call the episode "...a clever, hilarious, and moving piece of fine television."

Former Mayor of London and Prime Minister of the United Kingdom, Boris Johnson, responded to allusions made to him within the fictional newspaper articles about the "Water Gang" which appeared on screen during the episode's opening moments. The lower portion of the front page of a mocked-up newspaper described an unnamed London Mayor as "dithering, incoherent, and self-interested", listing "bizarre" policies including a "recently-mocked concept of putting an airport in the middle of the estuary", which The Telegraph say is "a clear reference to Boris Island." Johnson suggested that the joke, which The Telegraph reported was "visible for just a matter of second[s]", was "perfectly legitimate" as political satire and also could have been directed at the previous mayor. A spokesperson for the BBC said: "Sherlock is a fictional drama series. Both the newspaper and mayor featured in the episode were entirely fictional and were not named or politically affiliated."

IGN's Daniel Krupa had a more negative review, praising Benedict Cumberbatch's acting and some heartfelt, tender moments, but he was critical of the pacing, stating that "the rhythm was just erratic, never allowing you to really ease into the plot", and criticised the further exploration of the character's lives, rather than the adventures.

References

External links
 

Sherlock (TV series) episodes
Television episodes written by Steven Moffat
Television episodes written by Mark Gatiss
2014 British television episodes
Television episodes written by Stephen Thompson (writer)
Television episodes about weddings